The Pro-Cathedral of Our Lady of the Assumption or simply Church of Our Lady of the Assumption, is a religious building located in the city of Bandar Seri Begawan, capital of the district of Brunei-Muara, in the center-north of the country and Asian sultanate of Brunei, and the north end of the island of Borneo.

History 
Before the church was built in 1957, a small chapel, a school, and a parsonage existed. A local Catholic, George Newn Ah Foott, donated the land where these structures were built. The new church replaced the chapel.

The construction of the current church started in 1957 took 12 years to complete. The church was consecrated on Aug. 15, 1969, the feast of Assumption of Mother Mary.  A beautiful painting of Mary Assumed into Heaven, just below a crucifix of Jesus, adorns the backdrop of the church’s main altar.

The church is the pro-cathedral or temporary cathedral of the ecclesiastical jurisdiction, follows the Roman or Latin rite and serves as the seat of the Apostolic Vicariate of Brunei Darussalam (Vicariatus Apostolicus Bruneiensis) who obtained that status in 2004 by bull "Ad aptius consulendum" the Pope John Paul II.

It was under the pastoral responsibility of the Cardinal Cornelius Sim until 29 May 2021. It is the largest church in Brunei and is in the heart of the capital.

See also
Roman Catholicism in Brunei
Pro-Cathedral

References

Roman Catholic cathedrals in Brunei
Buildings and structures in Bandar Seri Begawan